Doolgunna or Doolgunna Station is a pastoral lease and sheep station located in the Mid West region of Western Australia. 

The name of the property is Aboriginal in origin but the meaning is not known.

The southern branch of the Gascoyne River rises near the Doolgunna homestead. 
 
Established at some time prior to 1927, Doolgunna was owned by G. J. Howard in 1929. The property was acquired by the Davies family in 1950.

In 2009 Sandfire Resources announced the discovery of a large high grade copper and gold deposit within the station boundaries at the DeGrussa tenement. The mine is powered off-the-grid by diesel, solar and batteries. Other exploration companies such as Great Western Exploration, Ausgold and Thundelarra Exploration were quick to pick up adjoining tenements.

See also
List of ranches and stations

References

Pastoral leases in Western Australia
Stations (Australian agriculture)
Mid West (Western Australia)